The VRVis Zentrum für Virtual Reality und Visualisierung (VRVis) is the largest independent research center in the area of Visual Computing in Austria, and one of the largest in Europe. It is one of currently 22 centrally funded COMET – Competence Centers for Excellent Technologies of Austria. The VRVis Center  is located in Ares Tower in Vienna.

History 
The VRVis Center for Virtual Reality and Visualization was founded in January 2000, and funded by the Austrian Kplus Competence Center program. The main initiator of the organization was Werner Purgathofer from TU Wien, with 3 other Austrian institutes as co-investigators. In 2010 and 2017 VRVis received new funding from the Austrian COMET program.

VRVis was located in the science and technology park Tech Gate Vienna since 2001, in 2017 it moved to Ares Tower in Vienna.

Organization and business  
VRVis functions as a cooperation between scientific and industry partners, partly funded by the Austrian and Viennese governments. It is organized as a non-profit limited company owned by an association that has the only purpose to administrate VRVis. The members of this association are currently (2017):
 TU Wien: 26% of the votes
 Graz University of Technology: 10% of the votes
 University of Vienna: 8% of the votes
 Austrian Institute of Technology: 1% of the votes
 Joanneum Research: 1% of the votes
 Medical University of Vienna: 1% of the votes
 Otto-von-Guericke-Universität Magdeburg: 1% of the votes
 Universität Stuttgart: 1% of the votes
 University of Utah: 1% of the votes

 approx. 30 partner companies: together 50% of the votes.

The main business of VRVis is strategic and application oriented research in Visual Computing, with an emphasis on transferring state-of-the-art scientific results to companies in all areas. This includes projects financed by other funding sources, such as European projects and the Austrian Science Foundation. More than 50 FTE researchers from various fields cooperate with scientific and industrial partners to produce software and system solutions. Around 500 scientific publications have been published and 20 best paper awards have been achieved so far.

The scientific cooperation network of VRVis is quite large, including ETH Zurich (CH), University of Bergen (N), University of Rostock (D), KAUST (Saudi Arabia), University Medical Center Freiburg (D), Institute Claudio Regaud (F), Fondazione Santa Lucia (I), Delft University of Technology (NL), St Thomas' Hospital (UK), Virginia Tech (USA), Arizona State University (USA), City University London (UK), European Space Agency ESA, Fraunhofer IGD (D), Stanford University (USA), University of Konstanz (D), Imperial College London (UK), University of North Carolina at Chapel Hill (USA), Deutsches Forschungszentrum für Künstliche Intelligenz DFKI (D), Institute of Science and Technology Austria (A), The Open University (UK), Technische Universiteit Eindhoven (NL) and many more.

Industry Partners include Agfa Healthcare (B/A), AVL List, Geodata, Austrian Federal Railways Infrastruktur AG, IMP - Research Institute of Molecular Pathology, Zumtobel Lighting, Austrian Power Grid, Hilti, Stadtentwässerungsbetriebe Köln, RHI Magnesita, GE Healthcare and many more.

Competence areas 
The VRVis Center does research and technology transfer in the following four areas:

Visualization 
 Scientific visualization
 Medical visualization 
 Scalable solutions

Visual analytics 
 Data mining 
 Simulation visualization 
 Software development

Rendering 
 Light simulation 
 Modeling 
 Virtual reality

Computer vision
 Segmenting of 3D data
 Reconstruction

References 

Laboratories in Austria
Research institutes in Austria
Engineering organizations
TU Wien